The modern constellation Virgo lies across one of the quadrants symbolized by the Azure Dragon of the East (東方青龍, Dōng Fāng Qīng Lóng), and Three Enclosures (三垣, Sān Yuán), that divide the sky in traditional Chinese uranography.

The name of the western constellation in modern Chinese is 室女座 (shì nǚ zuò), which means "the virgin constellation".

Stars
The map of Chinese constellation in constellation Virgo area consists of :

See also
Traditional Chinese star names
Chinese constellations

References

External links
Virgo – Chinese associations
 香港太空館研究資源
 中國星區、星官及星名英譯表
 天象文學
 台灣自然科學博物館天文教育資訊網
 中國古天文
 中國古代的星象系統

Astronomy in China
Virgo (constellation)